Charlotte Murphy (born 19 April 1988) is an Irish actress.

Early life
Murphy was born in Enniscorthy, the daughter of hair salon owners Brenda and Pat Murphy. She has five siblings. The family moved to Wexford when she was 12 years old. 

She trained at the Gaiety School of Acting from 2006 to 2008.

Career
Murphy's career has been in both television and feature film.

She performed the role of Siobhán Delaney in the RTÉ drama series Love/Hate, for which she won Best TV Actress at the 2013 Irish Film and Television Award, and Best Actress in a Lead Role at the 2015 Irish Film and Television Awards. She won a further two IFTA Awards in 2017, for Best Actress in a Supporting Role as Ann Gallagher in the BBC One drama series Happy Valley, and in 2018 for Best Actress in a Supporting Role as Jessie Eden in the BBC One historical crime drama series Peaky Blinders.

Personal life
She is in a relationship with British theatre and film director Sam Yates.

Filmography

Film and television

Stage

References

External links 
 
 Charlie Murphy on Twitter

Living people
Irish television actresses
Irish film actresses
Irish stage actresses
21st-century Irish actresses
People from Enniscorthy
Actresses from County Wexford
1988 births